The Golden Bell Award for Best Leading Actor in a Television Series is one of the categories of the competition for the Taiwanese television production, Golden Bell Awards. It was presented annually by the Government Information Office until 2011, when the Bureau of Audiovisual and Music Industry Development assumed responsibility for the Golden Bell Award ceremony. The first time that television programs were first eligible to be awarded was in 1971.

Winners and nominees

1980s

1990s

2000s

2010s

2020s

Notes

References

Leading Actor in a Television Series, Best
Golden Bell Awards, Best Leading Actor in a Television Series
Male television actors by award